The 2017 ASUN women's soccer tournament was the postseason women's soccer tournament for the ASUN Conference held from October 28 through November 5, 2017. The first round of the tournament was held at campus sites, with the higher seed hosting. The semifinals and final took place at Lipscomb Soccer Complex in Nashville, Tennessee, home of the Lipscomb Bisons, the regular season co-champions and tournament #1 seed. The six-team single-elimination tournament consisted of three rounds based on seeding from regular season conference play. The Florida Gulf Coast Eagles were the defending tournament champions and successfully defended their title, defeating the Lipscomb Bisons in double overtime in the final. The conference tournament title was the sixth for the Florida Gulf Coast women's soccer program, all of which came under the direction of head coach Jim Blankenship.

Bracket

Schedule

First Round

Semifinals

Final

Statistics

Goalscorers 

2 Goals
 Sope Akindoju - Jacksonville
 Varin Ness- Florida Gulf Coast

1 Goal
 Justis Bailey - Lipscomb
 Holly Fritz - Florida Gulf Coast
 Camille Knudstrup - Florida Gulf Coast
 Ellen Lundy - Lipscomb
 Cassidy Morgan - Florida Gulf Coast 
 Hannah Torbett - Lipscomb

See also 
 2017 ASUN Men's Soccer Tournament

References 

 
ASUN Women's Soccer Tournament